Dickenson Bay is located on the northwestern coast in Antigua, close to the Cedar Grove.

While Dickenson Bay is not the most secluded beach in Antigua, its white beaches and tranquil seas attract many visitors. A string of large resort hotels give Dickenson Bay one of the island's largest collections of rooms.  The beachfront is lined with restaurants, beach bars, and water sports concessions. Several small uninhabited islands and a one-mile long coral reef can be found off the coast of the bay.

References

External links
 Paradise Islands.org: Dickenson Bay, Antigua
 Tripadvisor.com: Dickenson Bay, Antigua
 Simonlaub.net: 360 degree panorama from Dickenson Bay, Antigua

Bays of Antigua and Barbuda
Saint John Parish, Antigua and Barbuda
Beaches of Antigua and Barbuda